Gopalakrishnan (born 9 May 1955), known professionally as Achamillai Gopi, is an Indian actor, singer, dramatist, and a voice over & dubbing artist. He has acted in a number of films and TV serials and has also given his voice for various cine actors in multiple languages. He is a singer, owns a band called "Gopi melodies" for more than 30 years, and has been consistently performing live shows. He is also the nephew of singer Shri. Vani Jairam.

He has acted in several films in Tamil, Telugu and Malayalam and has done over 1,000 telefilms and serials.

He has done a number of short films brought out by the state government, promoting social awareness, and was also bestowed the prestigious Doctor Malcolm Adiseshiah award by the Government of Tamil Nadu in 1998.

Early life and family 

Born in a closely knit small town in Thanjavur, Tamil Nadu his parents, Mr. M. Venkatraman, a retired Railway officer, and Ms. Meenakshi, named him V. Gopalakrishnan (fondly called 'Achamillai Gopi' today). His tryst with art and culture started right from his childhood.

Following the traditional and cultural routes laid by scholars such as Shri.Neela-Kunjumani, a legendary flautist duo fondly known as the Sikkil sisters, Shri.Mala Chandrashekar, veena pandit Shri. Pichumani, and Vani Jairam, being his relatives, he had a natural aptitude for theatre and music ever since his school days.

His love for music and theatre kept growing leaps and bounds as he grew older. The esteemed MLA Mr. G Kittappaand Mr. Vedhanarayanan, collector of Thanjavur district at that time, took notice of Gopi's talent and lauded him profusely.

Career

Musical Journey 

Though Gopi was naturally blessed with a good voice, he was trained under the tutelage of guru Shrimaan Kumbakonam Nataraj Iyer, and after a while, started his music troop 'Gopi Krishna' in 1970, facilitating his stage career and passion. Very soon he got the opportunity to do backing vocals for the maestro Ilaiyaraaja and sung many songs for composers like Ravindran, Narasimhan and V. Kumar.

Witnessing his singing prowess, music composer Mr. Joshua Rajan gave him the opportunity to sing on stage with playback singer T. M. Soundararajan

While he was running his own music troop, not only did he get to sing along with Mr. T.M. Soundarajan, but also happened to share the stage with some of the notable music directors and playback singers. He was the lead singer with the music troop of composer Mr. Shankar–Ganesh for eight years, and also with Shri S. P. Balasubrahmanyam, Mr. Gagai Amaran, and Malaysia Vasudevan for a number of years.

He also got opportunities to work with Sirkazhi Govindarajan, Thiruchi Loganathan, A.L. Raghavan, Mano, P. Susheela, S. Janaki, Vani Jairam, M. S. Rajeswari and Jamuna Rani.

He successfully runs his own orchestra 'Gopi melodies', a 24-person music band that has taken him places and has given him the opportunity to perform over 10,000 stages so far.

1972–1975 
In 1972, he was offered a job at the Accountant General's (AG) office. This job proved to be his major stepping stone to pursue his passion.

The silver screen celebrities like directors Mr. K. Balachander and Mr. Ananthu, screenplay writers Mr. G. Balasubramanian and Mr. Gokulnath, were all working in the AG's office then. Based on Gopi's performances during their annual cultural events, he was noticed and appreciated by them. He also participated in every singing competition and dramatics hosted by all the AG's offices of India, where he earned due recognition and accolades.

Television launch 

In the 1975 C.S.R.S.B. competitions organised by then chief minister of Tamil Nadu Mr. M.G.Ramachandran, Gopi won the best actor award in the acting category. The judges for this competition happened to be renowned celebrities in the Chennai television field, namely Mr. Gopali, M.S. Perumal (Director of the Doordarshan Kendra) and his acting troop, and Y.G.Parthasarathy, who suggested Gopi to join small screen to exhibit his talents better. Thus his journey with TV series started in 1975 with the super hit serial 'Periya Veetu Thinnai'.

Agricultural programs 
While Gopi was acting in a lot of telefilms, he decided to put into action some of Thiruvalluvar's lines. The great poet had once rightly stated that farmers are the life line of our country. In-line with that, Gopi proceeded to spearhead a show called 'Vayalum Vaazhvum' for the advancement and general betterment of farmers, creating awareness amongst them.

The show titled 'Periya veetu thinnai', story of a young, learned man named Kadhirmani (played by Gopi) who goes to a village and helps solve the problems that surface in a village, including antagonism amongst the farmers. The show got so popular and the character Kadhirmani, very pertinent and relatable, that the television network received hundreds of letters from farmers all over Tamil Nadu seeking advice and answers to their problems. That was when the producer of the show, Mr. M.S. Perumal, decided to give his character 'Kadhirmani' a promotion. Since he was well versed in acting and singing, he was asked to address their doubts and issues through songs and dance. This garnered enormous reviews and continued to air for 8 long years from 1976–1983. The show became outstandingly popular, and he was titled 'Kadhirmani Gopi' from then on.

A lot of esteemed celebrities participated in the 'Vayalum Vaazhvum' show, such as lyricist Mr. Vairamuthu, Mr. Thirupathooran, Mr. Kaamakotiyan, Mr. Poovai Sengutuvan, and Mr. Muthulingam. The scholar Pulamaipithan penned down lyrics and 'Thenisai Thendral' Deva, Mr. Gopal (A.I.R), Mr. S.V. Venkatraman and Mr. T. R. Baba composed music and Mr.M.S. Perumal directed it.

While he was performing in 'Vayalum vaazhvum', he simultaneously portrayed over 100 different characters in television shows that aired every Tuesday, directed by almost all the famous directors under the Chennai television network. Gopi still independently owns the title of having acted in the highest number of shows.

Small screen 
Though he started his television career with Doordarshan Kendra, he moved on to work in over 500 different serials in private TV station networks, directed and produced by companies such as Kavithalaya Productions, Mr. Bhagyaraaj, AVM Productions, Krishnaswamy Associates, Radaan Mediaworks, Balaji Telefilms Jayashree Pictures, Abhinaya creations, Anandha Vikatan, and so on.

His teleserials to name a few, Vanna Kolangal, Aadugiran Kannan, Maangalyam, Akshaya, Mahaan series, Anbulla Snegidhi by Madras Talkies and Ilakkanam Maarudho by K. Balachander went very popular among the viewers.

Under the direction of Mr. Venkat, he essayed the role of 'Neelakanta Iyer' in the hit series "Enge Brahmanan?," penned by the actor and writer Mr. Cho Ramasamy, that earned accolades not only nationwide but also garnered positive reviews from all across the globe.

The Chennai Art foundation has been kind enough to present him with the Best Actor Award not once, but on several occasions, for his contribution to the television world.

Dubbing 

In the film Poikkalkuthirai, one of K. Balachander directorial ventures, Mr. Ravindran played an interesting character that required dialogues to be voiced in a very unique manner. Gopi was given the opportunity to dub for this role and showcase his talents.

Since he had a good knowledge of music and was a trained singer, he modulated his voice to meet the highs and the lows that the role demanded and finished the dubbing of this character in a very short span of time that subsequently earned him the 'fastest dubbing' artist award.

Witnessing this, other directors gave him ample opportunities in various other movies to dub for their heroes who didn't speak the native language.

He also worked with writers such as Mr. Aaroor Dass, Mr. Vairamuthu and Mr. Marutha Bharani in several languages, both in original and remake works. Thus, with his prowess in dubbing, he has worked in over 200 movies.

He has dubbed for actors such as Mr. Rahman, Mr. Bhanu Chander and Mr. Vijay Babu in Tamil films; he has voiced for Mr. Venkatesh, Mr. Suman, Mr. Bhanu Chander and Mr. Nagarjuna for dubbed remakes of Telugu movies; and Mr. Rishi Kapoor, Mr. Govindha, Mr Anupam Kher for Hindi dubbed movies. In Tamil television serials, he has been the permanent voice for actor Subhalekha Sudhakar.

His English works include dubbing for the movie 'The Lost World', 'Titanic', and other James Bond movies.

He has also voiced several message telecasts and promo videos for the government of Tamil Nadu. He has dubbed for almost every leading actor in the television network.

Apart from being a member of the dubbing union for more than 30 years, he has also been the assistant secretary and continues to be the Vice President of the South Indian Dubbing Union.

Silver screen launch 

His first onscreen debut was offered by Mr K. Balachander, the man who had also given him his first dubbing project. He was to play a role alongside none other than Mr. Rajnikanth in ThilluMullu, a Balachander masterpiece.

His next project was under the tutelage of director Mouli, that starred SvShekar and himself as the heroes. The project titled Oru pullanguzhal aduppoothukirathu went on to become a silver jubilee hit amongst the masses.

His third project, Achamillai Achamillai, in which he played the second hero, once again under the direction of Mr. K. Balachander, proceeded to witness a silver jubilee victory too.

Thus, from being called 'Kadhirmani Gopi', he now got fondly titled 'Achamillai Gopi' by the audience.

He worked with Mr. Pandiyarajan in a movie titled Oora therinjukitten, which also saw a silver jubilee success.

Gopi happened to share screen space with 'Nadigar Thilagam' Sivaji Ganesan where he played the role of his son in the super hit movie Padikkadha Pannaiyar, directed by K. S. Gopalakrishnan.

Apart from his debut Thillu Mullu where he starred alongside the superstar, he also had the privilege of working with him in movies such as Velaikaran, Panakkaran, AdhisayaPiravi and Manithan.

Marupakkam was a milestone in his career. Directed by K. S. Sethumadhavan and starring Sivakumar and himself, this movie went on to bag the Golden Lotus and Silver Lotus National award for best feature film.

Filmography

As actor 
Films

Television
Akshaya
Enge Brahmanan
Vanna Kolangal
Mangalyam
 Take it Easy vazhkai
Dheerga sumangali
Sorgam
Kanavugal Aayiram
AarthiKasthuriKalyanee – Gemini TVVairanenjam( dubbed as aadajanma on Star Maa and Swarna manasu on Asianet)Anandham vilaiyadum veeduVasantham''
 Kodi Mullai

Dubbing artist 
Films

Television

References

External links 
 

Indian male film actors
Tamil male television actors
Tamil male actors
Tamil singers
Indian male voice actors
Living people
1955 births
Male actors in Tamil cinema